Yōhei, Yohei, Youhei or Yohhei is a masculine Japanese given name.

Possible writings
Yōhei can be written using different combinations of kanji characters. Some examples: 

洋平, "ocean, flat/peace"
洋兵, "ocean, soldier"
瑶平, "precious stone, flat/peace"
陽平, "sunshine, flat/peace"
陽兵, "sunshine, soldier"
容平, "contain, flat/peace"
燿平, "shine, flat/peace"
燿兵, "shine, soldier"
葉平, "leaf, flat/peace"
庸平, "common, flat/peace"

The name can also be written in hiragana ようへい or katakana ヨウヘイ.

Notable people with the name

, Japanese voice actor
, Japanese professional wrestler
, Japanese footballer
, Japanese footballer
, Japanese footballer
, Japanese footballer
, Japanese professional wrestler
, Japanese politician
, Japanese sumo wrestler
, Japanese footballer
, Japanese politician
, Japanese footballer
, Japanese footballer
, Japanese footballer
, Japanese footballer
, Japanese baseball player
, Japanese footballer
, Japanese footballer
, Japanese activist
, Japanese footballer
, Japanese judoka
, Japanese footballer
, Japanese footballer
, Japanese footballer
, Japanese footballer
, Japanese footballer

Fictional characters
Yohei Sunohara (春原 陽平), character in the visual novel Clannad
Yohei Hama (浜 洋平 Hama Yōhei) - Blue Turbo (ブルーターボ Burū Tābo), character in Kousoku Sentai Turboranger
Yohei Yamada (山田 ヨウヘイ), character from the anime and manga Chi's Sweet Home. Yohei is a little boy who finds Chi when she gets lost. He is cheerful, kind, obedient, and fond of toy trains.

Japanese masculine given names